McCaulley is an unincorporated community in Fisher County, Texas, United States. According to the Handbook of Texas, the community had an estimated population of 96 in 2000.

McCaulley is located at  (32.7820543, -100.2039923) and is situated along FM 57 in eastern Fisher County, approximately 9 miles southwest of Hamlin, TX, approximately 14 miles northeast of Roby,  and 38 miles northwest of Abilene.

Although McCaulley is unincorporated, it continues to have a post office in operation with the zip code of 79534.

Public education in the community is provided by the Roby Consolidated Independent School District. On July 1, 1990, Roby ISD absorbed the entirety of the former McCauley Independent School District. The Hamlin Independent School District also serves areas considered McCaulley.

References

External links

Unincorporated communities in Fisher County, Texas
Unincorporated communities in Texas